The Councillor Island, part of the New Year Group, is a  granite island located in the Bass Strait, lying off the north-west coast of Tasmania, Australia.

The island forms part of the King Island Important Bird Area because of its importance for breeding seabirds and waders.

Fauna
Breeding seabird and shorebird species include little penguin, short-tailed shearwater, fairy prion, common diving-petrel, Pacific gull, silver gull, sooty oystercatcher, black-faced cormorant and Caspian tern. Reptiles include eastern blue-tongued lizard.

See also

 List of islands of Tasmania

References

Islands of North West Tasmania
Islands of Bass Strait
Important Bird Areas of Tasmania
King Island (Tasmania)